Hamelin is a town on the river Weser in Lower Saxony, Germany. It is the capital of the district of Hamelin-Pyrmont and has a population of roughly 57,000. Hamelin is best known for the tale of the Pied Piper of Hamelin.

History

Hamelin started with a monastery, which was founded as early as 851 AD. A village grew in the neighbourhood and had become a town by the 12th century. The incident with the "Pied Piper" (see below) is said to have happened in 1284 and may be based on a true event, although somewhat different from the tale. In the 15th and 16th centuries Hamelin was a minor member of the Hanseatic League.

In June 1634, during the Thirty Years' War, Lothar Dietrich, Freiherr of Bönninghausen, a General with the Imperial Army, lost the Battle of Oldendorf to the Swedish General Kniphausen, after Hamelin had been besieged by the Swedish army.

The era of the town's greatest prosperity began in 1664, when Hamelin became a fortified border town of the Principality of Calenberg. In 1705, it became part of the newly created Electorate of Hanover when George Louis, Prince of Calenberg, later King George I of Great Britain, inherited the Principality of Lüneburg.

Hamelin was surrounded by four fortresses, which gave it the nickname "Gibraltar of the North". It was the most heavily fortified town in the Electorate of Hanover. The first fort (Fort George) was built between 1760 and 1763, the second (Fort Wilhelm) in 1774, a third in 1784, and the last (called Fort Luise) was built in 1806.

In 1806, Hamelin surrendered without fighting to the French forces, after Napoleon's victory at the Battle of Jena-Auerstedt. Napoleon's forces subsequently pulled down the town's historic walls, guard towers and the three fortresses at the other side of the river Weser. In 1843, the people of Hamelin built a sightseeing tower on the Klüt Hill, out of the ruins of Fort George. This tower is called the Klütturm and is a popular sight for tourists.

In 1867 Hamelin became part of the Kingdom of Prussia, which annexed Hanover in the aftermath of the Austro-Prussian War of 1866.

Between 1933 and 1937, the Nazi regime held the Reich Harvest Thanksgiving Festival at the nearby Bückeberg hill, to celebrate the achievements of Germany's farmers.

During the Second World War,  was used for the detention of Social Democrats, Communists, and other political prisoners. Around 200 died here; more died in April 1945, when the Nazis sent the prisoners on long marches, fearing the Allied advance. Just after the war, Hamelin prison was used by British Occupation Forces for the detention of Germans accused of war crimes. Following conviction, around 200 of them were hanged there, including Irma Grese, Josef Kramer, and over a dozen of the perpetrators of the Stalag Luft III murders. The prison has since been turned into a hotel. Executed war criminals were interred in the prison yard until it became full; further burials took place at the Am Wehl Cemetery in Hameln.  In March 1954, the German authorities began exhuming the 91 bodies from the prison yard; they were reburied in individual graves in consecrated ground in Am Wehl Cemetery.

The coat of arms (German: Wappen) of Hamelin depicts the St. Boniface Minster, the oldest church in the city.

Geography

Subdivisions

 Nordstadt
 Südstadt
 West/Klütviertel
 Ost/Basberg
 Mitte/Altstadt
 Wehl
 Afferde
 Hastenbeck
 Halvestorf (Halvestorf, Bannensiek, Weidehohl and Hope)
 Haverbeck
 Hilligsfeld (Groß und Klein Hilligsfeld)
 Sünteltal (Holtensen, Unsen, Welliehausen)
 Klein Berkel / Wangelist
 Tündern
 Wehrbergen
 Rohrsen

Demographics

Attractions

Tale of the Pied Piper
The town is famous for the folk tale of the Pied Piper of Hamelin, a medieval story that tells of a tragedy that befell the town in the 13th century. The version written by the Brothers Grimm made it popular throughout the world; it is also the subject of well-known poems by Johann von Goethe and Robert Browning. In the summer every Sunday, the tale is performed by actors in the town centre.

Twin towns – sister cities

Hamelin is twinned with:
 Kalwaria Zebrzydowska, Poland
 Quedlinburg, Germany
 Saint-Maur-des-Fossés, France
 Torbay, England, United Kingdom

Media
The , known as DeWeZet, publishes out of Hameln.

British army presence
Hamelin was home to several Royal Engineer units, including 35 Engineer Regiment and 28 Amphibious Engineer Regiment until summer 2014, with many of the British families housed at Hastenbeck (Schlehenbusch) and Afferde. It was also home to the Royal Corps of Transport unit of 26 Bridging Regiment RCT, comprising 35 Sqn RCT and 40 Sqn RCT, until 1971.

Notable people
Glückel of Hameln (1646–1724), Jewish businesswoman and diarist
Heinrich Bürger (1806–1858), German physicist, biologist and botanist
Oswald Freisler (1895–1939), lawyer and brother of Roland Freisler
Heinz Knoke (1923–1993), German officer of the Luftwaffe
Karl Philipp Moritz (1756–1793), German author
Peter the Wild Boy (found 1725), disabled boy
Saint Vicelinus (1086–1154), born in the town
Johann Popken, founder of company that became Ulla Popken
Max Richter (born 1966), neo-classical composer
Ida Schreiter (1912–1948), concentration camp warden executed for war crimes
Friedrich Sertürner (1783–1841), first to isolate morphine from opium (1822–1841)
Susan Stahnke (born 1967), German TV presenter
Friedrich Wilhelm von Reden (1752–1815), German pioneer in mining
Julius Wellhausen (1844–1918), Biblical scholar and orientalist

See also
German Fairy Tale Route
Metropolitan region Hannover-Braunschweig-Göttingen-Wolfsburg

Gallery

References

External links

  
Hameln Notgeld (emergency banknotes) depicting the story of the Pied Piper of Hamelin http://webgerman.com/Notgeld/Directory/H/Hameln.htm

 
Towns in Lower Saxony
Hameln-Pyrmont
Members of the Hanseatic League